David "Tulle" Carlsson (born March 7, 1983 in Stockholm, Sweden) is a Swedish footballer.

Career

IFK Mariehamn
Carlsson played a total of six seasons at IFK Mariehamn in Finland after his arrival from Swedish Älvsjö AIK FF. He scored both goals in the play-off final when IFK Mariehamn was promoted to the Veikkausliiga in 2004. He also scored second most goals in the league in his first season in the top flight (14 goals in 25 matches).

HJK Helsinki
In 2006 Carlsson went on a short-term loan to HJK Helsinki at the end of the season, but returned to Mariehamn. He only managed to score one goal while in Helsinki.

Brommapojkarna
On November 17, 2008 it was announced that Carlsson would join newly promoted Brommapojkarna, his former club, for the 2009 season in the Swedish top flight.

References

External links
Stats on Veikkausliiga.com 

1983 births
Living people
Footballers from Stockholm
Swedish footballers
Swedish expatriate footballers
Allsvenskan players
Superettan players
Veikkausliiga players
Helsingin Jalkapalloklubi players
IFK Mariehamn players
Association football forwards
IF Brommapojkarna players
Gröndals IK players
IK Brage players
FF Jaro players
Expatriate footballers in Finland
GBK Kokkola players